Munch is an English verb meaning 'to chew with a grinding, crunching sound' or 'to eat vigorously or with excitement', possibly deriving from the Old French verb  ('to eat'). Munch may also refer to:

Places
 Munch Township, Pine County, Minnesota

Media
 Cookie Monster Munch, a 1983 Sesame Street video game for the Atari 2600
 John Munch, a fictional character played by actor Richard Belzer
 Monster Munch (video game), an indirect clone of Pac-Man that was targeted towards the Commodore 64 gaming demographics
 Munch Bunch, a series of children's books written by British author Denis Bond
 Oddworld: Munch's Oddysee, a 2001 platform video game made by Oddworld Inhabitants
 Munchie, a fictional elf in Wee Sing: The Best Christmas Ever
 "Munch (Feelin' U)", a song by Ice Spice

Food
 Munch (candy bar), a candy bar manufactured by Mars, Incorporated and sold in the United States
 Munch, a chocolate bar made by Nestlé, and sold in India
 Mighty Munch, a corn snack available in Ireland made by Tayto
 Monster Munch, a baked corn snack available in the United Kingdom, produced by Walkers

Other
 Munch (surname)
 Especially Edvard Munch (1863–1944), Norwegian artist, painted The Scream
 Munch, or MUNCH, formally known as Munch Museum at Bjørvika
 Munch (BDSM), a low-pressure social gathering for people involved in or interested in BDSM
 Munch (crater), a crater on planet Mercury

See also
 Münch
 Munich
 Robert Munsch